The Celebration Cup, is a horse race for horses aged three and over, run at a distance of 1,400 metres (seven furlongs) on turf on 1 October (National Day of the People's Republic of China) at Sha Tin Racecourse in Hong Kong.

The Celebration Cup was first contested in 2014, and was upgraded to International Group 3 class in 2016.

Records
Record time:
 1:20.05 – Beauty Generation 2019

Most successful horse:
 3 – Beauty Generation (2017, 2018, 2019)

Most wins by a jockey:
 2 – João Moreira (2015, 2016)
 2 – Zac Purton (2018, 2019)

Most wins by a trainer:
 4 – John Moore (2016, 2017, 2018, 2019)

Winners

See also
 List of Hong Kong horse races

References
Racing Post:

Recurring events established in 2014
2014 establishments in Hong Kong
Horse races in Hong Kong